Jure Kocjan (born 18 October 1984) is a Slovenian former professional road racing cyclist, who rode professionally between 2005 and 2016.

Career
Born in Jesenice, Kocjan represented Slovenia in the Men's road race at the 2010 UCI Road World Championships. His first notable win came at the 2008 Vuelta a Cuba.

Kocjan joined  for the 2014 season, after his previous team –  – folded at the end of the 2013 season.

He was subsequently given a four year ban by the UCI, with his ban expiring in January 2020.

Major results

2004
 8th GP Kranj
2005
 1st Stage 1 Jadranska Magistrala
 7th Trofeo Zsšdi
2006
 1st Tour of Vojvodina
 2nd Trofeo Internazionale Bastianelli
 2nd Trofeo Gianfranco Bianchin
 2nd GP Kooperativa
 4th Giro del Mendrisiotto
 4th Gran Premio Palio del Recioto
 6th GP Kranj
 7th Trofeo Zsšdi
2007
 2nd Belgrade–Banja Luka II
 3rd Trofeo Zsšdi
2008
 Vuelta a Cuba
1st Stages 2 & 6
 2nd GP Kranj
 2nd Rund um die Nürnberger Altstadt
 4th Neuseen Classics
 8th Overall Tour of Qinghai Lake
1st Stage 8
 8th Tour de Rijke
2009
 2nd Road race, National Road Championships
 2nd Overall Étoile de Bessèges
1st Stage 3
 5th Overall Tour of Qinghai Lake
1st Stages 3 & 8
 7th GP Kranj
 7th Gran Premio Industria e Commercio Artigianato Carnaghese
 8th Gran Premio Città di Camaiore
 10th Cholet-Pays de Loire
2010
 1st Grand Prix Pino Cerami
 2nd Gran Premio di Lugano
 4th Gran Premio Industria e Commercio Artigianato Carnaghese
 5th Neuseen Classics
 7th Rund um Köln
 7th Trofeo Laigueglia
 10th Giro del Friuli
2011
 2nd Flèche d'Emeraude
 2nd Gran Premio dell'Insubria-Lugano
 4th GP Kranj
 4th Montepaschi Strade Bianche
 4th Gran Premio di Lugano
 4th Grand Prix d'Ouverture La Marseillaise
 5th Philadelphia International Championship
 6th Overall Tour du Limousin
 6th Gran Premio Industria e Commercio Artigianato Carnaghese
2012
Tour du Limousin
1st Stages 1 & 3
 7th Gran Premio Città di Camaiore
 8th Flèche d'Emeraude
 10th Route Adélie
2014
 1st  Overall Grand Prix Cycliste de Saguenay
1st  Points classification
1st Stage 4
 Vuelta a la Independencia Nacional
1st Stages 3 & 6a
 1st  Sprints classification Tour of Utah
 2nd Philadelphia International Championship
2015
 1st Stage 2 Tour of Utah
 2nd Winston-Salem Cycling Classic

References

External links

1984 births
Living people
Slovenian male cyclists
Sportspeople from Jesenice, Jesenice
Slovenian sportspeople in doping cases
Doping cases in cycling